Tang-e Zardeh-ye Farkhinvand (also Romanized as Tang-e Zardeh-ye Farkhīnvand; also known as Meleh Shotorkhān, Tang Zard, and Tang Zard-e Farkhīvand) is a village in Helilan Rural District, Helilan District, Chardavol County, Ilam Province, Iran. At the 2006 census, its population was 30, in five families. The village is populated by Kurds.

References 

Populated places in Chardavol County
Kurdish settlements in Ilam Province